A delayed hemolytic transfusion reaction (DHTR) is a type of transfusion reaction. According to the Centers for Disease Control's (CDC) National Healthcare Safety Network's (NHSN) Hemovigilance Module, it is defined as:


Mechanism
If a person without a Kidd blood antigen (for example a Jka-Jkb+ patient) receives a Kidd antigen (Jka-antigen for example) in a red blood cell transfusion and forms an alloantibody (anti-Jka); upon subsequent transfusion with Jka-antigen positive red blood cells, the patient may have a delayed hemolytic transfusion reaction as their anti-Jka antibody hemolyzes the transfused Jka-antigen positive red blood cells. Other common blood groups with this reaction are Duffy, Rhesus and Kell.

Diagnosis
 Positive direct antiglobulin test (DAT) for antibodies developed between 24 hours and 28 days after cessation of transfusion
 Positive elution test with alloantibodies present on the transfused red blood cells OR newly identified red blood cell alloantibodies in recipient serum.Antibody elution is the process of removing antibodies from the surface of red blood cells. Techniques include using heat, ultrasound, acids or organic solvents. No single method is best in all situations. In an elution test, the eluted antibodies are subsequently tested against a panel of reagent red blood cells of known phenotype.
 Inadequate rise of post-transfusion hemoglobin level OR rapid fall in hemoglobin level back to pre-transfusion levels OR otherwise unexplained appearance of spherocytes.

PROBABLE DIAGNOSIS
 Newly identified red blood cell alloantibody demonstrated between 24 hours and 28 days after cessation of transfusion BUT incomplete laboratory evidence to meet definitive case definition criteria.

Epidemiology
Delayed blood transfusion reaction occurs more frequently (1 in 20,569 blood components transfused in the USA in 2011) when compared to acute haemolytic transfusion reaction.

References

Transfusion reactions
Complications of surgical and medical care
Transfusion medicine